The Global Strategy Center is a skyscraper located in Xitun District, Taichung, Taiwan. As of December 2020, it is the 4th tallest building in Taichung and 22nd tallest in Taiwan.

See also 
 List of tallest buildings in Taiwan
 List of tallest buildings in Taichung

References

2015 establishments in Taiwan
Skyscraper office buildings in Taichung
Taichung's 7th Redevelopment Zone
Office buildings completed in 2015